Sir Joseph Andrew Chisholm (January 9, 1863 – January 22, 1950) was Mayor of Halifax and Chief Justice of the Supreme Court of Nova Scotia.

Biography
Born in St. Andrews, Nova Scotia to William and Flora Chisholm, Chisholm was educated at St. Francis Xavier University before moving to Halifax in 1896.

He attended Dalhousie University, where he received his law degree and his first job was in a law firm headed by a man destined to be a future Canadian Prime Minister, Robert Borden.

Chisholm was elected as Mayor of Halifax from 1909 to 1912. In 1916, Borden appointed him to the Nova Scotia Supreme Court, being the first Dalhousie graduate to be so named. He was appointed chief justice in 1931.

Chisholm also wrote historical articles about past Nova Scotia justices and contributed to the Catholic Encyclopedia. In 1909, he edited a revised edition of The Speeches and Public Letters of Joseph Howe.

In 1935, he became the last Nova Scotia Supreme Court justice to be knighted.

Joseph Andrew Chisholm was married to Frances Affleck, sister of Annie Affleck, wife of Sir John S. Thompson, in 1891. She died in 1903.

Chisholm died on January 22, 1950, in Halifax.

References

 The MacMillan Dictionary of Canadian Biography, Toronto, Macmillan, 1973, p. 136.

1863 births
1950 deaths
Canadian people of Scottish descent
Canadian Knights Bachelor
Canadian King's Counsel
Mayors of Halifax, Nova Scotia
Lawyers in Nova Scotia
Judges in Nova Scotia
Schulich School of Law alumni
People from Antigonish County, Nova Scotia
Contributors to the Catholic Encyclopedia
Dalhousie University alumni
St. Francis Xavier University alumni